Hypotia corticalis is a species of snout moth in the genus Hypotia. It was described by Michael Denis and Ignaz Schiffermüller in 1775 and is known from France, Spain, Portugal, Italy, Croatia, Greece, Sardinia, Corsica, Sicily, Crete and the Canary Islands.

The wingspan is about 18 mm. The forewings are brownish.

References

Moths described in 1775
Hypotiini
Moths of Europe
Moths of Asia